Alucita myriodesma is a species of moth of the family Alucitidae. It is known from Mozambique.

References

Endemic fauna of Mozambique
Alucitidae
Lepidoptera of Mozambique
Moths of Sub-Saharan Africa
Moths described in 1929
Taxa named by Edward Meyrick